Greg Turner is a Canadian Progressive Conservative politician who was elected to represent Moncton South in the Legislative Assembly of New Brunswick in the 2020 New Brunswick general election.

References 

People from Moncton
Progressive Conservative Party of New Brunswick MLAs
Living people
21st-century Canadian politicians
Year of birth missing (living people)